Rainford is an English-language toponymic surname from the village Rainford, Lancashire. Notable people with the surname include:

 Dave Rainford (born 1979), English footballer
 Johnny Rainford (1930–2001), English footballer
 Phil Rainford, British singer and record producer
 Rob Rainford (born 1966), Canadian television chef

See also 
 Ebony-Jewel Rainford-Brent (born 1983), English cricketer
 Rainford Hugh Perry

See also 
 
 Rainforth, variant spelling
 Rainsford, variant spelling
 Ranford (surname), variant spelling

References 

English-language surnames
English toponymic surnames